The British Rail Class 317 is an electric multiple unit (EMU) passenger train constructed by British Rail Engineering Limited in two batches, 48 sets being produced in 1981–82 and 24 sets in 1985–87. They were the first of several classes of British Rail EMU to be based on the all-steel Mark 3 bodyshell, departing from the "PEP"-aluminium design which had spawned the earlier Class 313 to Class 315, Class 507 and Class 508. The Mark 3 bodyshell was also the basis of Class 318, Class 455, and the diesel Class 150. The Class 317 uses overhead alternating current electrification.

Description

Class 317/1

The first batch of 48 units was built in 1981–1982 and was classified as Class 317/1.

Each unit is composed of four vehicles: two unpowered standard-class vehicles with driver's cabs, an intermediate trailer with both first- and standard-class seating, and an intermediate motor vehicle with second-class seating. The motor vehicle also carries the roof-mounted Stone Faiveley AMBR pantograph.

The technical description of the formation of the units is DTSO(A)-MSO-TCO-DTSO(B). Individual vehicles were numbered in the following ranges:
 DTSO(A): 77000–77047
 MSO: 62661–62708
 TCO: 71577–71624
 DTSO(B): 77048–77095

Bodyshells for the TCO vehicles in this batch were constructed at Derby Litchurch Lane Works, while construction of the other bodyshells and overall assembly was carried out at the Holgate Road Carriage Works in York.

The units were built to operate services on the newly electrified London St Pancras to Bedford route and were due to replace the elderly (and unreliable) Class 127 diesel multiple units in October 1982. However, their introduction was delayed until 28 March 1983 due to an industrial dispute with the unions over driver-only operation, and the diesel units lingered on until finally being replaced in mid-1983. Units were delivered in the standard livery of BR blue and grey.

In 1986, the route came under control of the Thameslink subsector of newly created Network SouthEast. From 1987, new dual-voltage Class 319 units were introduced on the route, allowing the creation of a new cross-London service, from Bedford to Brighton, via Farringdon and City Thameslink station. The Class 317 units were displaced to outer-suburban services on the WCML out of London Euston to Milton Keynes and Northampton. They replaced the slam-door Class 310 units, which subsequently transferred to the London, Tilbury and Southend railway.

However, the use of Class 317 units out of Euston again proved to be short-lived. In 1989, the second batch of new Class 321 were introduced onto WCML services. The Class 317 units were again displaced, this time to the Great Northern and West Anglia routes out of London King's Cross and London Liverpool Street, where they joined the second batch units. Therefore, for the first time, the entire Class 317 fleet was operating in the same place.

Class 317/2

The second batch of 20 units was built in 1985–1986 and were classified as Class 317/2. Units were numbered in the range 317349–317368. A further four units were built in 1987 and numbered 317369–317372. These units have same DTSO(A)-MSO-TCO-DTSO(B) composition as Class 317/1 units, and have vehicles numbered in the following ranges:
 DTSO(A): 77200–77219 and 77280–77283
 MSO: 62846–62865 and 62886–62889
 TCO: 71734–71753 and 71762–71765
 DTSO(B): 77220–77239 and 77284–77287
All vehicles in this batch were constructed at Holgate Road Carriage Works.

The second batch units were built to operate outer-suburban trains on the Great Northern route from London King's Cross to Stevenage, Cambridge and Peterborough. Like the first batch units, they were delivered in BR Blue/Grey livery. The units replaced the slam-door Class 312 units, dating from 1975, which subsequently transferred to the Great Eastern Main Line and London-Tilbury-Southend routes. Like the DC class 455 units, several aspects of the exterior were modified, with metal hopper ventilators replaced with larger panes of glass and the 'headcode indicator' flat front replaced with a rounded design.

In 1986, the route came under the control of the newly created Network SouthEast, which introduced a bold new blue, red and white livery. The extension of the overhead line equipment soon allowed the units to work services on the West Anglia route from London Liverpool Street to Cambridge. In 1992, electrification spread north from Cambridge to Ely and King's Lynn, allowing the replacement of locomotive-hauled trains.

The closely related Class 318 units, which were built for the Ayrshire Coast electrification in Scotland, are effectively a three-car version of the same design, but with a lower speed capability of 90 mph, and with traction motors provided by Brush instead of GEC.

Operations

With the privatisation of Britain's railways, the Class 317 fleet was incorporated into the West Anglia Great Northern (WAGN) franchise. Since then, various changes occurred to the fleet, as units were swapped and franchises changed. The following companies operated Class 317s after privatisation.

Greater Anglia

The Greater Anglia franchise used 15 Class 317/5 units, 24 Class 317/6 units, six Class 317/8 units and 12 Class 317/1 units, the last of which were transferred from Great Northern in 2017. They were mainly used on medium-distance services between London Liverpool Street / Stratford and Broxbourne / Hertford East and on longer distance services between London Liverpool Street/Stratford and Bishop's Stortford, Harlow Town and Cambridge. They were also used on some Bishops Stortford/Stansted Airport - Cambridge services. These trains were used on rush hour services from Liverpool Street to Witham and Ipswich while some class 321s were being refurbished. There was one class 317/7 demonstrator unit 317722. This unit has now been withdrawn and scrapped.

The fleet of 24 Class 317/6s were all refurbished with the following enhancements:

 New carpets in First Class cabins
 New hard wearing, 'easy to clean' vinyl flooring in Standard Class accommodation
 All the seats were retrimmed into new Moquette trim
 Repainted grab rails
 New dado side panels and wall end coverings
After the Class 317/6 were refurbished, Greater Anglia then carried out an interior refresh to its 15 Class 317/5 trains.

During 2021, all Class 317/6 units were scrapped at Eastleigh works. After this, the remaining Class 317s were refurbished with the following enhancements:

 PRM Accessible Universal Toilet (replacing the two passenger toilets)
 Call to aid Buttons
 PRM door buttons
 Wheelchair Spaces
 Improved Free Wifi

In addition, eight Class 317/7 units formerly operated by London Overground were brought back into use by Greater Anglia in 2020 as supplementary PRM-compliant units following the withdrawal of the 317/6 fleet.

The final scheduled Class 317 workings took place on 16 July 2022, with the last Class 317s withdrawn at the end of July 2022

West Anglia Great Northern, First Capital Connect & Great Northern

WAGN Railway used the Class 317 fleet on various services, including all London Liverpool Street to Cambridge services on the West Anglia route, and many stopping services to intermediate destinations. The fleet also worked services on the Great Northern route, from London King's Cross to Cambridge, Peterborough, Hertford, Stevenage and King's Lynn, plus at weekends when the line to Moorgate was closed, the units operated inner suburban services from London King's Cross to Letchworth Garden City, Hertford and Welwyn Garden City.

In 1998/99, WAGN Railway started to refurbish its Class 317/2 fleet. The work was carried out by Railcare at Wolverton Works.

The Stone Faiveley AMBR pantograph was replaced by the industry standard Brecknell Willis high speed pantograph. Units were reclassified as Class 317/6 and were renumbered into the range 317649–672.

Many of the WAGN Class 317/1 units still wore the Network SouthEast (NSE) blue and red livery dating from 1986. In 2001, a new livery of metallic purple with lilac doors was introduced. The first unit so treated was 317 312, which had recently returned from loan to LTS Rail. The livery was progressively applied to the Class 317/1 fleet, with the final NSE examples (317 328 & 317 345) disappearing by mid-2004. By April 2004, the only units not repainted were 317301–307, which were hired to Thameslink and remained in LTS livery. The WAGN purple livery was also applied to Class 313 and Class 315 EMU trains.

In April 2004, the WAGN franchise was split into the Great Northern and West Anglia routes. The latter became part of the new National Express East Anglia franchise, which operated under the title of One Railway. Great Northern was temporarily operated independently under the WAGN brand name, until it was merged with the Thameslink franchise in April 2006. These changes resulted in the Class 317 fleet being divided among First Capital Connect and National Express East Anglia.

First Capital Connect carried out a minor interior refresh to its 12 Class 317 EMU trains inherited from WAGN. Govia Thameslink Railway operated the 12 strong Class 317/1 fleet from when the new franchise began on 14 September 2014 until 21 May 2017 where they were replaced by the Class 387. These units formerly operated Great Northern services, but have since transferred to Greater Anglia.

London Overground
On 31 May 2015, London Overground took over operation of the Liverpool Street to Chingford, Enfield Town and Cheshunt via Seven Sisters, using eight units Class 317/7 and six units Class 317/8.  All these trains had an exterior repaint, however not all were internally refurbished. They were all replaced by Class 710 "Aventra" in 2020.

LTS Rail & c2c
In 1996, LTS Rail (renamed c2c in 2000) began to hire Class 317/1 units from its sister Prism Rail franchise WAGN for use on the London, Tilbury and Southend railway. At first only two units were hired, but by mid-1997 this had increased to a total of 18 units. Units were maintained at LTS Rail's main East Ham Depot.

The Class 317 units enabled LTS Rail to replace the elderly Class 302 slam-door EMUs, the last examples of which were withdrawn in 1998. The Class 317 units also replaced some of the Class 310 fleet on off-peak workings, pending introduction of new Class 357 "Electrostar" units.

Many of the units hired to LTS Rail were repainted in a variation of the existing Network SouthEast blue, red and white livery. The red stripe was replaced with a green stripe, and both the blue band and green stripe extended to the cab ends.

The units were slowly returned to WAGN from 1999, with the introduction of the new "Electrostar" units. The last examples were returned by 2000. However, unreliability of the "Electrostars" meant that four units were still hired on a daily basis until 2002. These units were maintained as part of the main WAGN fleet, and therefore the specific units involved changed when units required maintenance at WAGN's Hornsey TMD depot.

Thameslink
In 2002, Thameslink began hiring four Class 317/1 units from WAGN to allow it to run additional Bedford to Moorgate services. Unlike when units were hired to LTS Rail, specific units were not involved. Instead, units were still maintained by WAGN and only hired for a fortnight. Two units each week were transferred in each direction, generally being hauled over the non-electrified route by two Class 31 locomotives provided by Fragonset Railways or Class 47 locomotives with barrier vehicles at either end of the Class 317.

In 2004, when the WAGN franchise was split, twelve Class 317/1 units were transferred to Thameslink from the Great Northern route. This was because a planned route blockade for engineering works meant that extra units were required for Bedford services. The Class 317 units were replaced on Great Northern by Class 365 "Networkers", themselves displaced from South Eastern Trains by new Class 375 "Electrostars".

The Class 317 units transferred to Thameslink were maintained at the newly built Bedford Cauldwell depot in Bedford. They were restricted to services on the Northern half of the franchise only, as only dual-voltage or DC units can operate South of Farringdon. All units were returned to National Express East Anglia following the end of the blockade.

National Express East Anglia

On 1 April 2004, the West Anglia and Stansted Express routes became part of the new One franchise.

This was operated under the brand name 'one' until 26 February 2008, when it was rebranded as National Express East Anglia. during introduction, the units had one of six different liveries: the old WAGN white; a debranded version of 'one' livery (minus the rainbow car ends); the same but with a white, National Express branded, stripe; three different Stansted Express liveries and the new National Express corporate scheme, similar to that of National Express East Coast and National Express Coaches.

National Express East Anglia secured the bid for thirty brand new Bombardier Class 379 trains which had all entered service as of August 2011.

Stansted Express

In 2000, nine Class 317/1 units were selected to be refurbished for the dedicated Stansted Express service, from London Liverpool Street to Stansted Airport, replacing the previously dedicated Class 322 units. The work was again carried out by Railcare at Wolverton, and included the fitting of luggage racks and new window frames, identical to existing 317/2 units. The units also received a revised front end design, and a new metallic blue livery. The nine units were reclassified as Class 317/7, and were renumbered such that the last two digits of the set number remained unchanged. Again some Class 317/7 units have had their original Stone Faiveley AMBR pantograph replaced by the Brecknell Willis High Speed design.

In 2006 12 further Class 317 EMU trains were given a more basic refresh of new carpets, retrimmed seats in new moquette and new dado side panels; by Wabtec Doncaster and the bodysides were painted in a lighter shade of blue than the Class 317/7. These units were reclassified as Class 317/8.

Both Classes 317/7 and 317/8 could occasionally be found working on West Anglia services and also it was not uncommon for Classes 317/5 and 317/6 units to work Stansted Express services alongside the dedicated Classes 317/7 and 317/8.

Following the arrivals of the new Class 379 units on Stansted Express services, the Class 317/7s and 317/8s were originally used alongside other Class 317s as a common pool. This changed when Abellio took over the East Anglia franchise on 5 February 2012, as the Class 317/7s were deemed too expensive to lease and surplus to requirements, and so they entered storage.

Aborted proposals

Fitting of new traction equipment
At the end of the National Express East Anglia franchise, Angel Trains opted to use off-lease Class 317/7 unit 317722 as a test-bed unit and engaged Bombardier Transportation to rebuild it as a pre-series unit with new traction equipment. The DC motors, traction electronics and thyristors were removed, though the original transformer remained in place. The original bogies were modified to accept new AC motors, and three-phase converters fitted. Regenerative braking was also fitted. Because AC motors are more reliable than DC ones and require significantly less maintenance, this should potentially bring significant cost savings. The work has the potential to extend the life of the Class 317 by up to 20 years. Angel Trains and Bombardier will evaluate the performance of the unit compared to a conventional Class 317.

At the same time, a £1 million interior refurbishment was carried out on two vehicles of the same unit - driving trailer standard open 77021 and motor standard open 62682. The interiors were refurbished in a Metro style layout and provided a direct contrast to the 3+2 and 2+2 seating in use on the remainder of the unit. Trials to test the reaction of passengers commenced with Greater Anglia in mid-2014. Trials were not particularly successful, and the unit was kept at Ilford for several years before being withdrawn in early 2019.

Accidents
Fourteen people were injured.

Fleet details

Named units 

A number of units carry or have carried names as follows:

 317345: Driver John Webb
 317348: Richard A Jenner
 317363: The Hatfield Comet
 317370: Harlow 50 Years 1947-1997
 317371: Stevenage New Town 50 Years - 1946 - 1996
317372: Welwyn Garden City Seventy  Five Years
 317507: University of Cambridge 800 Years 1209-2009
 317654: Richard Wells
 317709: Len Camp
 317723: The Tottenham Flyer
 317892: Ilford Depot

Preservation
DTSO vehicle 77092 from unit 317345 is preserved at the East Anglian Railway Museum, and TCO vehicle 71621 from the same unit is at The Depot in Caxton. The static display will show the history of both the Class 317 fleet and that of electrification in Anglia.

Notes

References

Further reading

External links

317
317
Train-related introductions in 1983
25 kV AC multiple units